Leiner Gomez (Chinese: 戈麦斯; born 17 November 1982) is a Colombian former footballer.

China
Landing in China on 17 March 2009, Gomez was unable to feature as Jiangsu Sainty took on Shanghai Shenhua on the 22nd of March 2009 due to not getting his transfer certificate on time. He then opened his Chinese Super League scoring account to hold Beijing Guoan 1-1, starting despite an insipid performance on debut a week earlier. However, manager Zhang Yudao described his showing during those two games as mediocre, with the Colombian's agent apologizing that he did not meet expectations as well. Ultimately, he stopped training with Jiangsu and separated with them that June.

References

External links 
 
 

Living people
1982 births
Association football forwards
Expatriate footballers in Panama
Expatriate footballers in Ecuador
Expatriate footballers in Venezuela
Expatriate footballers in China
Colombian expatriate footballers
Expatriate footballers in Guatemala
Chinese Super League players
Jiangsu F.C. players
Atlético Huila footballers
La Equidad footballers
C.D. Árabe Unido players
Jaguares de Córdoba footballers
Uniautónoma F.C. footballers
Deportivo Pereira footballers
Boyacá Chicó F.C. footballers
Colombian footballers